Nicolas Florentin (born February 16, 1978 in Pont-à-Mousson) is a retired French football midfielder.

External links

1978 births
Living people
French footballers
AS Nancy Lorraine players
AS Beauvais Oise players
ES Troyes AC players
Stade Malherbe Caen players
Angers SCO players
Ligue 1 players
Ligue 2 players
Association football midfielders